A not exhaustive list of Italian canals include:

Canale Alicorno
Canale Brentella
Canale di Battaglia
Canale Cavour
Canale Emiliano Romagnolo
Giudecca Canal
Canale Industriale
Canale Maestro della Chiana
Canale Piovego
Canale Villoresi
Fissero
Grand Canal
Idrovia Ferrarese
Litoranea Veneta
Muzza Canal
Navicelli channel
Navigli
Naviglio di Bereguardo
Naviglio di Brescia
Naviglio Grande
Naviglio Martesana
Naviglio di Paderno
Naviglio Pavese

 
Italy
Canals
Canals
Canals